Charles Oguk (17 June 1964 – 5 January 2020) was a Kenyan field hockey player. He competed in the men's tournament at the 1988 Summer Olympics.

References

External links
 

1964 births
2020 deaths
Kenyan male field hockey players
Olympic field hockey players of Kenya
Field hockey players at the 1988 Summer Olympics
Place of birth missing